The Girl in Room 20 is a 1949 movie directed by and starring Spencer Williams. The story features Daisy Mae Walker, an aspiring singer from a small town in Texas, who comes to New York City to pursue a show business career, only to fall prey to a sleazy nightclub owner. Thanks to the intervention of a kindly taxi driver, Daisy Mae is able to achieve her goals. The film is categorized as a race film.

The Girl in Room 20 was filmed in 1946, but did not receive theatrical distribution until 1949.

A 2002 Chicago Tribune article describes the film as provocative.

Cast
 Geraldine Brock
 Spencer Williams
 July Jones (actor)

See also
 List of films in the public domain in the United States

References

External links
 

1949 films
Films directed by Spencer Williams
1949 drama films
American black-and-white films
Race films
American drama films
1940s American films